The 2011 season was Shirak's 21st consecutive season in the Armenian Premier League and covers the period from 1 January 2011 to 31 December 2011.

Squad

Transfers

In

Loan in

Out

Released

Competitions

Premier League

Results summary

Results

Table

Armenian Cup

2011

Final

2011–12

The Semifinal took place during the 2012–13 season.

Statistics

Appearances and goals

|-
|colspan="16"|Players away on loan:
|-
|colspan="16"|Players who left Shirak during the season:

|}

Goal scorers

Clean sheets

Disciplinary Record

References

Shirak SC seasons
Shirak